Chaleh Kand (also Romanized as Chāleh Kand; also known as Chālākand) is a village in Ali Sadr Rural District, Gol Tappeh District, Kabudarahang County, Hamadan Province, Iran. At the 2006 census, its population was 384, in 75 families.

References 

Populated places in Kabudarahang County